Ardeosaurus is an extinct genus of basal lizards, known from fossils found in the Late Jurassic Solnhofen Plattenkalk of Bavaria, southern Germany. It was originally thought to have been a species of Homeosaurus.
 
Ardeosaurus was originally considered to be a distant relative to modern geckos, and had a similar physical appearance. Evans and colleagues, however, showed it in 2005 to be a basal squamate outside the crown group of all living lizards and snakes. A subsequent study conducted by Simões and colleagues in 2017 corroborated its initial proposed phylogenetic placement, indicating that Ardeosaurus was a stem-gekkotan. It was probably nocturnal, and had jaws specialised for feeding on insects and spiders.

References

Scincogekkonomorpha
Jurassic lizards
Jurassic reptiles of Europe
Fossil taxa described in 1860